Stavanger Airport, commonly just known as Sola, is an international airport  located in Rogaland county, Norway. It is Norway's third-busiest airport, with both fixed-wing aircraft and helicopter traffic for the offshore North Sea oil installations. In addition, the Royal Norwegian Air Force operates Westland Sea King search and rescue helicopters from Sola Air Station.

The airport had 85,306 air movements and 4,501,368 passengers in 2015.  Five airlines offered domestic flights to nine destinations while ten airlines offered international flights to 37 destinations. Two helicopter companies operate out of Sola. The busiest route is Sola–Oslo Gardermoen, which has about 28 daily flights. In the vicinity of the airport there is an aeronautical museum, Flyhistorisk Museum, Sola.

History

Facilities
Stavanger Airport, Sola is Norway's oldest airport, opened by King Haakon VII 29 May 1937. The airport was the second to have a concrete runway in Europe. The airport was attacked and captured by German fallschirmjägers from 1st battalion of the 1st Regiment, 7th Flieger Division supported by Luftwaffe aircraft on 9 April 1940.  The attack was over in an hour, and the airport remained in German hands for the duration of World War II. During the war, the German occupation forces and Luftwaffe expanded the airport considerably, as it was a vital strategic asset for the Germans.  Former anti-aircraft positions are also still visible along the neighboring beach Solastranda.

Originally, the idea was to locate the Stavanger airport at Forus in Stavanger Municipality, but after the war the Royal Norwegian Air Force decided to use Sola temporarily until the new airport was built, and nothing ever became of Forus. Sola Air Station has since been of vital importance for the Norwegian armed forces, but gradually lost assignments, and in 1982 the last fighter squadron left the airport.

Stavanger Airport has two passenger terminals, one for airplanes and one for helicopters. When the present terminal was put into use 28 January 1987, it was the first airport in Norway to have jet bridges, nine in total.  The old terminal was demolished and made way for taxiway H The airport has two crossing runways: the main runway, north–south (18/36) and the main runway for helicopters, which is oriented northwest–southeast (10/28).

Expansion of the airplane terminal took place in 2009. The new gates were built without jetbridges. The airport's two largest airlines, SAS and Norwegian, showed little interest in such amenity and desired quicker turnaround times. SAS though later said that they did want jetbridges for their larger jet aircraft, and only wanted gates without jetbridges for their smaller turboprop aircraft. The lack of jetbridges angered the societies representing the disabled and multiple sclerosis afflicted, and prompting several Rogaland politicians to put pressure on Avinor to reconsider the building. In April 2009, Avinor decided not to build jetbridges.

Offshore helicopter flights out of Stavanger commenced in 1966. Instead of operating out of Sola, the operator Helikopter Service decided to operate their services out of Stavanger Airport, Forus, a closed-down airport built during the Second World War. Throughout the 1970s and 1980s this became an increasingly problematic solution, not least due to increased development of the area. It eventually became inevitable to relocate the base to Sola. To allow for the transfer, the airport authority built a new, separate helicopter terminal at Sola, costing 56 million Norwegian kroner. It opened on 7 March 1989, at the same time as operations ceased out of Forus. At the same time Helikopter Service built an operations center at the airport, including a hangar and maintenance center. In total the relocation from Forus cost about 120 million kroner.

Civilian airlines

Det Norske Luftfartsselskap (DNL, later Scandinavian Airlines System or SAS) started flying to Sola after the war, as did Braathens SAFE in 1946 on its routes to Europe and the Far East with the Douglas DC-3 aircraft. In 1952, Braathens SAFE received concession to fly the routes Oslo–Stavanger, Oslo–Kristiansand–Stavanger and the coastal route Stavanger–Bergen–Ålesund–Trondheim–Bodø–Tromsø. Widerøe established itself at Sola in the late 1980s after they bought Sandefjord Airport, Torp-based Norsk Air.  For a time, SAS operated intercontinental nonstop flights between Stavanger and Houston George Bush Intercontinental Airport (IAH) located in Texas in the U.S., with this service being operated by PrivatAir with Boeing 737-700 jetliners configured with 44 business class seats.

When the oil exploration in the Norwegian part of the North Sea started in 1967, there was a sudden need for helicopter transport out to the oil platforms. The first helicopter service was Helikopter Service, later renamed CHC Helikopter Service, who started operations with 2 Sikorsky S-61Ns initially from a makeshift heliport at Stavanger Airport, Forus.  The offshore helicopter operations were moved to the Sola in 1989. Braathens Helikopter, a sister company of Braathens SAFE, also operated helicopters from Sola in the period 1989–1994, but was then sold to Helikopter Service. Norsk Helikopter, later renamed Bristow Norway, started their offshore flying at Sola in 1993.  Bristow Norway is now the biggest helicopter company in Sola, with the average of 28 departures each day Monday–Friday.  CHC Helicopter Service has the average of 8 departures each day Monday–Friday.

Foreign airlines
British Airways predecessors had started operating at Sola after World War II, in 1980 they started regular flights with British Aircraft CorporationBAC One-Eleven jet aircraft to London Heathrow Airport. Later, the route was operated with Boeing 737-200/-300/-400s. For a period the Boeing 737-400 morning flight continued to Paris–Charles de Gaulle after London Heathrow as an extension of the flight. British Airways later started operating Boeing 757-200s with Boeing 737-200s flying new services twice daily to London–Gatwick. In 1994, British Airways employees at Sola were transferred to Braathens SAFE as part of new cooperation between the two airlines.  However, in 1997, KLM bought 30% of Braathens (as the airline was renamed) and British Airways closed its Stavanger routes, because it lacked its own staff.  Today British Airways operates 2 daily rotations
utilising Airbus A319 jet aircraft from London Heathrow Airport in competition with SAS Scandinavian Airlines (Also 2 rotations) to London Heathrow Airport, Norwegian operates a daily rotation to London, Gatwick. Dan-Air flew the route London–Gatwick – Newcastle – Stavanger, until they were taken over by British Airways in 1992. Norwegian Air Shuttle has flown to Newcastle as well. Eastern Airways operating Embraer ERJ-145 and ERJ-135 regional jets and Widerøe using Bombardier Dash-8-402Q (Q400) propjets both fly to Newcastle, U.K.

The oil industry has also required scheduled routes between Stavanger and Scotland, primarily to British oil center in Aberdeen. In addition to SAS, Air Anglia (later AirUK, KLMuk) flew the route. Today, this route is flown by Scandinavian Airlines, Widerøe and Eastern Airways. In the 1970s, KLM Royal Dutch Airlines started flights to Stavanger from Amsterdam. They have used the Douglas DC-9-10, Boeing 737, Fokker 100, Fokker F27 and Fokker 50 aircraft, and this route was the first operated by KLM with Fokker 70s (their first Fokker 70 is named "City of Stavanger"). The route was operated by Braathens between 1997 and 2002. Today, this route is flown by the KLM five times daily by Boeing 737, Fokker 70 and Embraer ERJ-190 aircraft, the latter two aircraft operated by KLM Cityhopper. 

Air France also operated to Stavanger, initially routing Paris–Charles de Gaulle - Stavanger - Gothenburg using Boeing 737s. The route later became a twice-daily direct Paris - Stavanger connection using Embraer ERJ-170 jet aircraft, until it was discontinued in October 2015.

The Norwegian authorities have denied, among others, Northwest Airlines (since merged into Delta Air Lines) the right to start flying intercontinental flights from the United States. Lufthansa started in 2003 to fly twice daily to its hub in Frankfurt in Germany with the Canadair RJ-700 aircraft, but ceased flying the route in October 2015.

In 2005, work to upgrade the terminal building started. A new domestic arrival hall was opened in the summer of 2005, followed by the refurbishing of the international arrival hall. A new international lounge finished in 2006 and a new baggage sorting system, and an extension of the check-in areas was completed in 2007. Avinor is working on the instrument landing system category II/LVTO approach system at the airport. This will allow planes to land with as little as 300 meters of horizontal visibility. 

On 15 February 2010, Scandinavian Airlines announced that Widerøe would take over their regional routes connecting airports in Western Norway, including the route from Stavanger to Kristiansand. SAS will retire their five Fokker 50 aircraft by November 2010, and Widerøe will take over the operations and 75 employees, and serve the routes using Q300 and Q400 aircraft.

Airlines and destinations
The following airlines operate regular scheduled and charter flights at Stavanger Airport:

Traffic and statistics

Sola Air Station

The armed forces have a number of functions located at the airport. The 330 Squadron operated Sea King search and rescue helicopters are the only squadron left at the airport, but still a number of military aircraft can be seen at the airport. NATO's AWACS aircraft, VIP transports, airlift command and fighter and attack aircraft are regular visitors. Technicians and equipment at the Sola AFB facilitate turnover and housing of fighters, predominately the RNoAF F-16A Fighting Falcons, as well as F-16s and other aircraft from NATO allies. Facilitating the Marines and Airforces training base, NATO FORSACS and NATO Joint Warfare Centre amongst others.

The Sola AFB is a NATO 24-hour readiness base for deployment of aircraft and military personnel in the event of a military escalated tension or conflict.

Technical facilities
Sola has a number of technical facilities, and has the largest aviation technical environment in Norway, including the largest helicopter maintenance facilities in Northern Europe, Braathens had its technical main base at Sola, as does Norwegian Air Shuttle, CHC Helikopter Service, Heli-One Norway, Bristow Norway, Norsk Helikopterservice, Norcopter, Pratt & Whitney Norway Engine Centre and the air force's helicopter main technical base. The former Braathens hangars now house SAS Technical Services, Norwegian Technical Services (which has their technical main base for their Boeing 737 fleet here) and Norsk Helikopterservice is to move into the former Braathens paint-hangar.  Heli-One (when part of Helikopter Service) had final assembly of most of the Bell 412 helicopters when introduced to the RNoAF. Both Bristow and Heli-One have their heavy duty maintenance facilities for their Sikorsky S-92A at the airport. Heli-One also specialises in the maintenance of the Turbomecca engines and the gearbox of the Super Puma. The airport also has the only Norwegian education school for aircraft mechanics, they are certified by Eurocopter qualifying them to make conversions of Eurocopter helicopters, they perform heavy duty maintenance tasks for many operators and air forces of foreign nations.

On 16 June 2006 the board of SAS decided to close the SAS owned Braathens Technical Services at Sola, which resulted in over 300 job losses.  This was despite Beaathens Technical Services being the only profit making heavy maintenance center in the SAS Group and award winner in achievements, the SAS unions having the upper hand since SAS acquired Braathens. Braathens Technical Services undertook services for many customers including Boeing. 

On 31 March 2012 the board of Pratt & Whitney also decided to close the Pratt & Whitney Norway Engine Center. The last engine left the shop on 20 June 2012. All 195 jobs were lost. 
Later Gulf Aero Services opened a new engine center in the same building complex under the company name Aero Gulf, delivering basically the same services as the former Pratt & Whitney Norway Engine Center. As per June 2017 maintaining and servicing CFM56-3/7b/5b jet engines under the company name Aero Norway AS Quality Engines for a growing number of both domestic and international airlines.

Runways
The airport has two asphalt paved runways: the main runway 18/36 measures  (Mark up, original 80 m wide, and runway 10/28 is  although initially built 65 m wide,. The two airstrips cross each other, but since they have a different orientation, they could never operate as individual runways for planes, but 10/28 is most commonly used as the activate helicopter runway, whilst 18/36 for planes, although the helicopters utilise the CATII on runway 18/36. 10/28 is used when the situation demands for it to serve as the main runway, typically when heavy winds from The Atlantic Ocean occurs, and landing in heavy gusts of crosswind makes it demanding to operate to and from 18/36. Although the orientation isn't ideal for operating planes from both runways, they are both most commonly active at the same time, 18/36 for planes and 10/28 for helicopters operating from it, having to keep well within the bounds of their intersection allowing for helicopters to operate from 28 to taxiway H, and departure from 11 from taxiway H, utilising both directions for helicopters, hotel and to the outer edge. Runway 18–36 has a CAT II landing system, enabling landing in very poor visibility. 10/28 has no traditional instrument approaches such as ILS, and is less frequently used, among other considerations to reduce noise emissions and flying over built areas, catering for population living in central parts of Sola municipality. The runway does however have low RNP approaches to both runway 10 and 28.

Accidents
See 1961 Holtaheia Vickers Viking crash.

On 9 August 1961 Vickers VC.1 Viking 3B (registration: G-AHPM), operated by Cunard Eagle Airways (later British Eagle) crashed on into a mountain near Holta on approach to Stavanger Airport, Sola from London Heathrow airport with the deaths of all 39 on board: 3 crew, 34 schoolboys from The Archbishop Lanfranc School in Thornton Heath, London, plus two members of staff from the school. The Norwegian report on the incident concluded that the pilot was off-course for unknown reasons. The 50th anniversary was marked by a book published in summer 2011, The Lanfranc Boys by Rosalind Jones, sister of Quentin Green, one of the victims.

On 7 January 2020 a major fire broke out in the main parking garage, later found to have started from a vehicle with faulty wiring (2005 Opel Zafira) as the driver attempted to start the vehicle and it subsequently caught fire then quickly spread to nearby cars. The fire burned for nearly 7 hours, causing a partial collapse of the parking garage and destroying an estimated two to three hundred vehicles. An important factor that influenced the spread of the fire was a lack of a sprinkler system. No injuries or fatalities were reported.

References

Bibliography

External links 
 
 
 
 
 
 

Transport in Stavanger
Sola, Norway
Airports in Rogaland
Airports established in 1937
Avinor airports
Heliports in Norway
1937 establishments in Norway
Water aerodromes in Norway
International airports in Norway